The third and final season of Salem, an American horror–drama television series on WGN America, premiered on November 2, 2016, and concluded on January 25, 2017, consisting of ten episodes. Created for television by Adam Simon and Brannon Braga, who write or co-write episodes of the show, the series is based on the Salem Witch Trials. It was executive produced by Braga, Coby Greenberg and David Von Ancken, with Braga and Simon assuming the role of showrunner.

On January 25, 2017, Salem was canceled after three seasons.

Cast

Production
On July 11, 2015, WGN America renewed Salem for a 10-episode third season. On April 5, 2016, it was revealed the show would premiere the week of Halloween, rather than the usual April premiere slot. The series premiered on November 2, 2016.

Episodes

References

2015 American television seasons